The CFA International Cat Show is a cat show hosted by the Cat Fanciers' Association. The Cat Fanciers' Association was founded in 1906 after it separated from the American Cat Association.

The CFA International Cat Show has been held on an annual basis since 1994 with the exceptions of 2007, 2010, and 2020. Considered the Rolls-Royce of international cat shows, it is the largest show of its type in the US. Atlanta, Georgia and Houston, Texas have each hosted the event a record four times. Males or neutered males have won the "Best in Show" fifteen of the twenty-four times the show has been held. The Persian cat breed has won "Best in Show" sixteen of the past twenty-four shows.  The show was renamed the CFA-Royal Canin World Championship in 2012. Dr. Elsey's Precious Cat Litter became lead sponsor in 2013. In 2015 it returned to using the "CFA International Show" name.

Competition
In 2019, the show was held on October 12–13 in Cleveland, Ohio. The show was traditionally held the weekend before Thanksgiving in November in the United States. At each show, there are twelve to sixteen specialty judging rings, which are for both long-haired and shorthaired cat breeds, including kittens, Championship cat (non-spayed or neutered pedigree cats over eight months old), and Premiership cat (spayed or neutered pedigreed cats over eight months old). Day one of the show is preliminaries for best in breed such as Persian, Maine Coon, and Tonkinese. The second and final day of the competition shows the best in each cat breed in all three categories mentioned then compete for the best in each category overall, then for "Best in Show", which the overall winner of the competition. Top five winners in each category and overall are presented.

Charity
Proceeds from the show go to the Winn Feline Foundation. Since 1968, the foundation has raised over $2 million with the entire amount going to cat health research.

Foundation 
CFA Foundation was created on June 22, 1990, the original idea to having a foundation was to educate people on cat history, but has since turned into a museum, Feline Historical Museum, with a complete library full of more than 1,400 books about all things cat related

List of Best in Shows

Official Sites
CFA International Show website
 CFA Facebook page
CFA International Show Informational website for exhibitors

See also
Supreme Cat Show

References

Cat shows and showing
Recurring events established in 1994
Awards to animals